A.S.D. Nuovo Monselice Calcio  (formerly Monselice Calcio 1926) is an Italian association football club in Monselice in the Province of Padua. They have played in Serie C2 and Serie D, but now play in the Prima Categoria.

References

External links
Official site

Monselice
Province of Padua
Monselice
1926 establishments in Italy
Monselice